Michael Sushil Adhikari (1924–1997) was a Christian Bangladesh Awami League politician and the former State Minister.

Early life
He was born on 14 January 1924 in Kathira, Barisal, East Bengal, British Raj. He graduated from Bishnupur Mission School and Brojomohun College.

Career
He was the president of the Bangladesh Baptist Sangha from 1968 to 1997 and Bangladesh Church Council. He was a state minister and afterwards he was a government adviser on NGO Affairs. He collaborated with poet Jibananda Das.

Death
He died on 15 July 1997 in Kolkata, West Bengal, India from cancer.

References

Awami League politicians
1924 births
1997 deaths
Bangladesh Krishak Sramik Awami League central committee members